The 1982–83 Scottish Second Division was won by Brechin City who, along with second placed Meadowbank Thistle, were promoted to the First Division. Montrose finished bottom.

Table

References 

Scottish Second Division seasons
3
Scot